"A Milli", abbreviated occasionally as "Milli", is a song by American rapper Lil Wayne. The song was released February 13, 2008, as the second official single from his sixth album Tha Carter III.

Background
The original version leaked early on several mixtapes. Then, a second version, with the first verse from the album version, a verse from Cory Gunz and the final two verses from the original version, was leaked prior to the album version. "A Milli" was played several times when sampling the record before its release, and was originally slated to appear on Tha Carter III in multiple versions as "skit-like" tracks, featuring artists such as Tyga, Cory Gunz, Hurricane Chris, and Lil Mama though the tracks never made the final cut.  They were rumored to appear on the re-release of Tha Carter III, until Wayne revealed that the aforementioned album would be a rap rock album called Rebirth with no connection to Tha Carter III. "A Milli" was ranked the number one hip hop song of 2008 by MTV. The song samples "Don't Burn Down the Bridge" by Gladys Knight & the Pips. The sample is different in both early and final versions. While the early version plays the sample as it is, the final version adds a filter effect to the sample. In addition, the main vocal sample is from the Vampire Mix of "I Left My Wallet in El Segundo" by A Tribe Called Quest. The line "I'm okay, but my watch sick" was originally from "Go Crazy" by Young Jeezy.

Critical reception
The song won the Best Rap Solo Performance at the 2009 Grammy Awards.

Blender ranked it the number one song of 2008.

Rolling Stone named it the 10th best song of 2008, the 63rd best song of the 2000s, and the 486th best song of all time.

Time critic Josh Tyrangiel named "A Milli" the number four song of 2008, and it was ranked as the number one song of 2008 in the MTV News Bigger Than the Sound poll.

Complex ranked its beat the 31st greatest hip hop beat of all time.

Chart performance
"A Milli" peaked at number six on the Billboard Hot 100, making it Lil Wayne's second top ten and second-highest peaking song on the chart as a lead artist at the time. It has reached number one on Hot R&B/Hip-Hop Songs, making it his second number-one song on that chart. It was also able to top the Hot Rap Tracks like his previous single "Lollipop". As of 2011, "A Milli" has sold 2,053,000 digital copies.

Remix
The official remix, dubbed "A Milli Freemix", was made by Wayne to thank his fans, celebrating his first week sale of one million copies of Tha Carter III. In the remix, Wayne also hinted at the production of Tha Carter IV.

Music video
The music video was shot on June 23, 2008, in Los Angeles, California, (the same day as the video for "Got Money").

The video premiered on 106 & Park July 2, 2008. It consists of Lil Wayne preparing for the shoot of his following single "Got Money". The video, which was directed by Dayo Harewood, Lil Wayne and Jeff Panzer, features appearances by Birdman (giving Wayne his brand new car for his record sales), Lil Twist, T-Streets, Gudda Gudda, Kidd Kidd and Brisco.

Track listing
"A Milli" (Clean)
"A Milli" (Explicit)
"A Milli" (Instrumental)
"A Milli" (Acapella)

Charts

Weekly charts

Year-end charts

Certifications

See also
List of number-one R&B singles of 2008 (U.S.)

References

2008 singles
Cash Money Records singles
Grammy Award for Best Rap Solo Performance
Lil Wayne songs
Song recordings produced by Bangladesh (record producer)
Songs written by Lil Wayne
Songs written by Bangladesh (record producer)
2008 songs